Logan Township is one of the thirteen townships of Sherman County, Kansas, United States.  The population was 246 at the 2000 census.

Geography
Located in the center of the county, it borders the following townships:
Voltaire Township — north
Itasca Township — east
Smoky Township — south
Lincoln Township — west
Grant Township — northwestern corner
It lies west of the county seat of Goodland.  While part of Goodland lies within the township's original boundaries, the city is not part of the township. There are no communities in the township proper.

Several intermittent headwaters of Beaver and Sappa creeks flow through Logan Township.

Transportation
Interstate 70 and U.S. Route 24 travel east–west through Logan Township, and K-27 runs north–south along the border with Itasca Township.Interstate 70 and U.S. Route 24 travel east–west through the township.  A railroad line also travels east–west through Logan Township, just north of the interstate.

Government
As an active township, Logan Township is governed by a three-member board, composed of the township trustee, the township treasurer, and the township clerk.  The trustee acts as the township executive.

References

External links
County website

Townships in Sherman County, Kansas
Townships in Kansas